Dorstenia arifolia is a plant species in the family Moraceae which is native to eastern Brazil.

References

arifolia
Plants described in 1786
Flora of Brazil